La italianita, is a Venezuelan telenovela created by Inés Rodena and adapted by Ana Mercedes Escámez for Radio Caracas Televisión in 1974. This was the first adaptation that made the original story of Inés Rodena. Marina Baura and Elio Rubens star as the main protagonists.

Cast

References

External links 

1973 telenovelas
Venezuelan telenovelas
Spanish-language telenovelas
RCTV telenovelas
1973 Venezuelan television series debuts
1973 Venezuelan television series endings
Television shows set in Venezuela